Ida Township is a township in Douglas County, Minnesota, United States. The population was 1,057 at the 2000 census.

Geography

Fishermen love it for walleyes and Northern Pike along with Largemouth and Smallmouth Bass.

Demographics
At the 2000 census, there were 1,057 people, 422 households and 332 families residing in the township. The racial makeup of the township was 98.20% White, 0.09% Native American, 0.19% Asian, 0.66% from other races, and 0.85% from two or more races. Hispanic or Latino of any race were 0.85% of the population.

There were 422 households, of which 25.8% had children under the age of 18 living with them, 73.0% were married couples living together, 3.8% had a female householder with no husband present, and 21.3% were non-families. 17.8% of all households were made up of individuals, and 6.9% had someone living alone who was 65 years of age or older. The average household size was 2.50 and the average family size was 2.83.

22.4% of the population were under the age of 18, 4.9% from 18 to 24, 23.4% from 25 to 44, 31.3% from 45 to 64, and 18.0% who were 65 years of age or older. The median age was 45 years. For every 100 females, there were 111.0 males. For every 100 females age 18 and over, there were 105.0 males.

The median household income was $45,208 and the median family income was $51,528. Males had a median income of $29,559 compared with $22,885 for females. The per capita income for the township was $19,221. About 2.3% of families and 5.1% of the population were below the poverty line, including 5.9% of those under age 18 and 8.6% of those age 65 or over.

References

Townships in Douglas County, Minnesota
Townships in Minnesota